Mission Academy is a co-educational CBSE School with Hostel facility in Bareilly, Uttar Pradesh situated at SH-37, Mandanpur, Baheri and is currently run by The "Mission Academy Samiti".

History
'Mission Academy was Founded by two eminent educationist Late N.L. Gangwar and Shri M S Gangwar in 1997.
Before the establishment of Mission Academy the region has many small schools but they lacked the modern style of education. It was only after the establishment of Mission Academy that the world class knowledge started flowing to the Baheri Region and with the continuous efforts of the Mission Academy Staff in a very short span of time Mission Academy Started producing Students with multiple talents. And very soon the fame of Mission Academy reached whole Bareilly region.

In starting Mission Academy had a small building with 225 students but as the fame grew more and more Parents were interested in getting their wards enrolled in this school. So, To accommodate the expanding enrollment more land was used to build new class rooms. and now Mission Academy Holds More than 2,000 Students.

The number of Daily scholars is more, and to pick & drop these students mission Academy runs more than 16 buses with reach of around 30 kilometers circle.

Activities
Mission Academy not just focus on studies but also on the co-curricular activities, the major events celebrated at campus are :-

Republic Day         = On 26 January
Independence Day     = On 15 August
Gandhi Jayanti       = On 2 October
Teachers Day         = On 5 September
Children's Day       = On 14 November
Annual Athlete Meet  = In December
Annual Function      = In March–April
All above mentioned events are full of Different Dances, Vocal activities (Singing), Games & Sports and other cultural activities.

Students
The students studying here are from all backgrounds, urban as well as rural. But majority is from nearby rural areas picked and dropped by fleet of school buses.

References

External links
 Official Website

Primary schools in Uttar Pradesh
High schools and secondary schools in Uttar Pradesh
Bareilly district
Educational institutions established in 1997
1997 establishments in Uttar Pradesh